Blenheim is a historic home located near Wakefield Corner, Westmoreland County, Virginia. It was built about 1781, and is a two-story, three bay, Late Georgian style brick dwelling. It has a gable roof and two-story, frame wing. The house was built by the Washington family to replace the original family house at Wakefield soon after it burned on Christmas Day, 1779.  The house was built for William Augustine Washington, the son of George Washington's half-brother Augustine Washington II.

It was listed on the National Register of Historic Places in 1975.

References

External links

Blenheim, State Route 204 vicinity, Oak Grove, Westmoreland County, VA: 4 photos and 4 measured drawings at Historic American Buildings Survey

Washington family residences
Historic American Buildings Survey in Virginia
Houses on the National Register of Historic Places in Virginia
Georgian architecture in Virginia
Houses completed in 1781
Houses in Westmoreland County, Virginia
National Register of Historic Places in Westmoreland County, Virginia